Brookview, New York is a small hamlet located in Schodack, New York and just outside Castleton, New York.

Brookview is named for the Moordener Kill that runs through the hamlet. Brookview Road runs from East Greenbush through Brookview and then to Castleton-on-Hudson, New York. The hamlet of Brookview, however, includes only a small portion of Brookview Road. A section of Brookview Road is part of New York State Route 150. Brookview is mostly residential. A train station was located in the hamlet until it was taken down in the mid 20th century.

Hamlets in New York (state)
Hamlets in Rensselaer County, New York